Derek Alan Trevis (9 September 1942 – 21 December 2000) was an English professional footballer who played as a midfielder. Active in both England and the United States, Trevis made nearly 500 career league appearances.

Career
Born in Birmingham, Trevis began his professional career in 1962 with hometown club Aston Villa. Trevis also played in the Football League for Colchester United, Walsall, Lincoln City and Stockport County, before moving to the United States to play in the North American Soccer League.  He signed with the Philadelphia Atoms, captaining the team and leading it to the 1973 NASL Championship.  He was player-coach with the San Diego Jaws and the Las Vegas Quicksilvers.

Honors
Philadelphia Fury
North American Soccer League season 1973

References

External links
 
 NASL career stats

1942 births
2000 deaths
English footballers
English football managers
Aston Villa F.C. players
Colchester United F.C. players
Walsall F.C. players
Lincoln City F.C. players
Stockport County F.C. players
Philadelphia Atoms players
San Diego Jaws players
Las Vegas Quicksilver players
Philadelphia Fury (1978–1980) players
English Football League players
North American Soccer League (1968–1984) players
North American Soccer League (1968–1984) coaches
Association football midfielders
English expatriate sportspeople in the United States
Expatriate soccer players in the United States
English expatriate footballers